Honolulu Control Facility (HCF)  is an air traffic control facility located in Honolulu, Hawaii, United States operated by the Federal Aviation Administration (FAA). This facility includes the Honolulu International Airport control tower and the Honolulu Center Radar Approach Control (CERAP), itself a combined TRACON-area control center unit covering the Pacific Ocean surrounding the Hawaiian islands. The FAA dedicated the facility in January 2002.

Facility Includes
 - HCF Center
 - HCF Approach (HNL, OGG, and ITO)
 - Kaneohe Bay Approach
 - Honolulu International Tower

References

Air traffic control centers
Aviation in Hawaii
Air traffic control in Oceania
Air traffic control in the United States
2002 establishments in Hawaii
Daniel K. Inouye International Airport